Specsavers Optical Group Ltd is a British multinational optical retail chain, which operates mainly in the UK, Ireland, Australasia, Canada and the Nordic countries. The chain offers optometry and optician services for eyesight testing and sells glasses, sunglasses, and contact lenses. It also sells hearing aids. In the United Kingdom in 2012 it had the largest single market share of the four major opticians, with 42% of the market.

The company had a total turnover of £2.78 billion in 2018/2019 with 2,111 branches in the United Kingdom, Guernsey, Jersey, Ireland, Norway, Sweden, Finland, Denmark (under the brand ), the Netherlands, Spain, Australia, New Zealand and Canada.

History and market position

The group was launched in 1984, by husband and wife team Doug Perkins and Mary Perkins, on the island of Guernsey.

As well as stores in the United Kingdom, Specsavers are present in Ireland, the Netherlands, the Nordic countries, Spain, Australia and New Zealand. The company ventured into hearing services in 2002. Their Hearing Centres division provides hearing tests and hearing aids within the Specsavers optical stores, providing services from more than 400 locations.

Specsavers also sell collections by Jeff Banks, Timberland, Hackett London and Quiksilver for men, Converse and Tommy Hilfiger for men and women, and Roxy, Cath Kidston, Karen Millen and Kylie Minogue.

The co-founder of Specsavers, Mary Perkins, was appointed a Dame Commander of the Order of the British Empire in the Queen's Birthday Honours List in 2007, in recognition of her services to business and the community in Guernsey.

In April 2004, Specsavers acquired the Blic Optik franchise from its Swedish owner Optimum Optik AB. In 2007, finance director John Perkins became joint managing director, with his father Doug Perkins.

In The Sunday Times Rich List 2011, published in the United Kingdom on 8 May 2011, Douglas and Dame Mary Perkins and family were ranked 56th in the list of Britain's Wealthiest People. Their personal worth was estimated at £1.150 billion, with Dame Mary becoming Britain's first self-made female billionaire.

In May 2021 it was announced that in March 2021 Specsavers had entered the North American market with its purchase of 18 practices from Canada-based Image Optometry.

Advertising campaigns
In February 2007, Specsavers was ranked No. 46 of the United Kingdom's 100 Heaviest Spenders on TV Advertising, spending £27 million. Specsavers' long running advertising campaign is based on the popular strapline "Should've gone to Specsavers". A common theme of these adverts is a character making a mistake because of poor eyesight. These include a sheep farmer who shears his sheepdog, and an elderly couple who ride the Infusion rollercoaster after mistaking the seats of the ride for a bench. 

Specsavers' use of Édith Piaf in advertisements has caused some adverse comment in the press, although the estate of the performer had granted full permission. Other Specsavers adverts have featured Thunderbirds, Postman Pat, Mr. Men and John Cleese as Basil Fawlty.

In 2017, Specsavers officially launched a range of eyewear designed by the popstar, singer and actress Kylie Minogue.

Criticism of internet retailers 
In March 2005, Specsavers publicly criticised Glasses Direct, an internet retailer, claiming that an internet service "did not meet required standards" and "could not offer advice from dispensing opticians". In 2006, James Murray Wells, the managing director of Glasses Direct, claimed that four major high street retailers including Specsavers were "leading a campaign to stop prescription glasses being sold over the internet".

Structure

The firm operates most of their stores under a  'Joint or Shared Venture Partnership', consisting of a partnership between an Optometry Director and a Retail Director.

This is similar to a franchise agreement; however, unlike many franchises, a customer from one branch of the company should expect to get equal service from another branch. It also differs in that Specsavers own shares in the franchisee business rather than just providing goods and services under a franchise agreement. In other territories such as Sweden, Norway and Spain, they operate a normal franchise agreement.

The company took advantage of the development of the Any Qualified Provider initiative in the English National Health Service from 2009 to expand into the hearing aid business.

In May 2020, Specsavers set up a video consultation service for the first time, to check people's eyes and hearing aids during the COVID-19 outbreak.

Controversies

JobKeeper
On 15 September 2021, it was revealed in a 7.30 Report exposé that SpecSavers had taken advantage of the Australian government's JobKeeper scheme.  JobKeeper was designed to subsidise wages for Australian workers during the COVID-19 lockdown period from April to September 2020.  The intended recipients of JobKeeper were companies struggling financially throughout the pandemic. SpecSavers applied for the subsidy, receiving over A$90 million during these 6 months.  Despite having a strong year across the optometry vertical, including reported profits for SpecSavers, this subsidy resulted in an increase of revenue by more than 100% year on year.

Outcry resulted from this report due not only to SpecSavers not requiring the full subsidy, but also that the profits which were sourced from tax contributions in Australia were immediately directed offshore to SpecSavers headquarters in the known tax haven of Guernsey.

Another cause for public condemnation was SpecSavers had only repaid A$4 million, when other companies like Cochlear, CIMIC and Mirvac had already repaid larger amounts while still taking a hit in their revenues.

Business strategy and future
The Perkins have stated that they intend to maintain family control of the firm, which currently employs  two of their three children in senior roles. Continued expansion into Europe is planned. It is also intended that the company will continue to supply hearing aids.

The Perkins attribute their success to their franchise model, and to the deregulation of the UK Opticians market by the Conservative Prime Minister Margaret Thatcher in the 1980s, allowing opticians to use previously forbidden advertising and marketing techniques to rapidly take over a market that had belonged to independent local opticians.

The Perkins have said of the remaining local opticians that "their days are numbered", and in fact their major competition now comes from large chains such as Boots Opticians and Vision Express.

In February 2016, it was announced that Specsavers would be the sponsors of the County Championship cricket competition in England and Wales, for the next four years; a deal which was extended in 2018 to include Test series held in England including the 2019 Ashes series. In January 2017, Specsavers were in negotiation to have shops undertake certain front line medical care linked to sight and hearing, in both the United Kingdom and the Netherlands.

In May 2020, Specsavers announced a plan to cut 450 jobs amid a "dramatic downturn" caused by the COVID-19 outbreak. The company had previously tried to avoid making redundancies by implementing pay cuts and reducing working hours.

References

External links 

 

Retail companies of the United Kingdom
Eyewear retailers of the United Kingdom
British companies established in 1984
Retail companies established in 1984
Eyewear retailers of Australia
Eyewear retailers of New Zealand
Private providers of NHS services
Eyewear companies of the United Kingdom